Janko Šimrak (29 May 1883 – 9 August 1946) was a Croatian Greek Catholic hierarch. He was Apostolic Administrator from 1941 to 1942 and bishop from 1942 to 1946 of the Eastern Catholic Eparchy of Križevci.

Life 
Born in Šimraki, near Samobor, Austria-Hungary  (present day – Croatia) in 1883, he was ordained a priest on 23 August 1908 for the Eparchy of Križevci. Fr. Šimrak was the spiritual director and then prefect of the Greek Catholic Seminary in Zagreb from 1908 to 1935.

In 1941 he became Apostolic Administrator and was appointed by the Holy See an Eparchial Bishop on 9 May 1942. He was consecrated to the Episcopate on 16 August 1942. The principal consecrator was Bishop Ivan Bucko, and the principal co-consecrator was Blessed Archbishop Alojzije Stepinac.

He died in Križevci on 9 August 1946.

References 

1883 births
1946 deaths
People from Zagreb County
20th-century Eastern Catholic bishops
Croatian Eastern Catholics
Greek Catholic Church of Croatia and Serbia